This is a list of artists who are known for producing music in the geek rock genre including its subgenres such as nerd punk and trock.

1970s and earlier
± The Beatles (1960-1970)
 Captain Beefheart and the Magic Band (1964-1982)
 ±David Bowie (1963-2016)
 Descendents (1977–present)
 Devo (1973–present)
 ± Elvis Costello (1970–present)
 ± Kraftwerk(1970–present)
 Oingo Boingo (1979-1995)
Robyn Hitchcock (1972-2006)
 ± Rush (1968–2018)
 ± Talking Heads (1975–1991)
 Tori Amos (1979–present)
 "Weird Al" Yankovic (1976–present)
 XTC (1976–2006)
 ± Frank Zappa (1955–1993)

1980s
 Barenaked Ladies (1988–present)
 Crash Test Dummies (1988–present)
 The Dead Milkmen (1983–present)
 Thomas Dolby (1981–present)
 GWAR (1984–present)
 Moxy Früvous (1989–2001)
 Mr. Bungle (1985–present)
 The Proclaimers (1984-present)
 They Might Be Giants (1982–present)
 Violent Femmes (1980–present)
 Ween (1984–present)

1990s
 Andrew W.K. (1998–present)
 The Aquabats (1994–present)
 Belle and Sebastian (1996–present)
 Ben Folds Five (1993–present)
 Bowling for Soup (1994–present)
 Dynamite Hack (1997–present)
 Fountains of Wayne (1996–2013)
 Logan Whitehurst & the Jr. Science Club (1997–2006)
 Minibosses (1999–present)
 Motion City Soundtrack (1997–present)
 The Mountain Goats (1991–present)
 Nerf Herder (1994–present)
 Ozma (1995–present)
 Radioactive Chicken Heads<ref
name="Topić" /> (1993–present)
 Tenacious D (1994–present)
 Warp 11 (1999–present)
 Weezer (1992–present)
 Wheatus (1995–present)

2000s
 alt-J (2007–present)
 Chameleon Circuit (2008–2014)
 Jonathan Coulton (2003–present)
 The Darkest of the Hillside Thickets (2003–present)
 The Franchise (2004–2008)
 Harry and the Potters (2002–present)
 hellogoodbye (2001–present)
 I Fight Dragons (2009–present)
 Lemon Demon (2003–present)
 The Protomen (2003–present)
 Paul and Storm (2004–present)
 Thundering Asteroids! (2009–present)

2010s
 The Doubleclicks (2011–present)
 Double Experience (2014–present)
 Five Year Mission (2010–present)
 Time Crash (2012–present)

Note
 ± Rock and Roll Hall of Fame inductee

References

Lists of musicians by genre
Lists of rock musicians
Lists of bands